The posterior labial nerves are branches of the pudendal nerve.

The counterparts in males are the posterior scrotal nerves.

See also
 Anterior labial nerves

External links
  - "The Female Perineum: Muscles of the Superficial Perineal Pouch"
  - "Inferior view of female perineum, branches of the internal pudendal artery."

Nerves of the lower limb and lower torso